Dolnje Cerovo ( or ) is a settlement in the Municipality of Brda in the Littoral region of Slovenia on the border with Italy.

The local church is dedicated to Saint Lawrence and belongs to the Parish of Cerovo.

References

External links
Dolnje Cerovo on Geopedia

Populated places in the Municipality of Brda